"Misery" is a song by the English rock band the Beatles from their 1963 debut album Please Please Me. It was co-written by John Lennon and Paul McCartney. According to Lennon, "It was kind of a John song more than a Paul song, but it was written together." McCartney was to say: "I don't think either one of us dominated on that one, it was just a hacking job."

A 1963 single by Kenny Lynch made "Misery" the first Beatles' song to be covered by another artist.

Background
In February 1963, Helen Shapiro was Britain's most successful female singer (having first achieved chart success two years earlier at the age of 14) and The Beatles were fifth on the bill as part of her nationwide tour of the United Kingdom. Her artist and repertoire manager, Norrie Paramor, was looking for new material for a country and western album she planned to record in Nashville, Tennessee and suggested that the Beatles compose a song especially for her. "Misery" was started backstage before The Beatles' performance at the King's Hall, Stoke-on-Trent, on 26 January 1963, and later completed at Paul McCartney's Forthlin Road home. At the time, McCartney commented: "We've called it 'Misery', but it isn't as slow as it sounds, it moves along at quite a pace, and we think Helen will make a pretty good job of it." But Paramor considered it unsuitable, and so British singer and entertainer Kenny Lynch, who was on the same tour, recorded it instead (HMV Pop 1136), thus becoming the first artist to cover a Lennon–McCartney composition although he failed to enter the charts with it. In 1973, Lynch appeared in the cover photograph for McCartney's album, Band on the Run.

When the Beatles needed original material for their Please Please Me LP they recorded it themselves, giving its treatment, according to writer Ian MacDonald, "a droll portrait of adolescent self-pity". It was credited to McCartney and Lennon in that order, as were all other Lennon & McCartney originals on the Please Please Me album. The songwriting credit was changed to what would become the more familiar "Lennon–McCartney" for their second album, With the Beatles. McCartney: "It was our first stab at a ballad and had a little spoken preface. It was co-written. I don't think either of us dominated on that one, it was just a job, you could have called us hacks, hacking out a song for someone." (Barry Miles. Paul McCartney: Many Years From Now).

The Beatles recorded "Misery" on 11 February 1963 (marathon session) in 11 takes. Norman Smith was the engineer.

George Martin played the piano solo, which was added at a later date, and preferred recording this onto the recorded track at half speed an octave below which would then sound correct at normal speed.

Release
British LP: Please Please Me
American LP: Introducing... The Beatles
British EP: The Beatles (No. 1)

Personnel
John Lennon – lead vocals, acoustic rhythm guitar
Paul McCartney – lead vocals, bass guitar
George Harrison – lead guitar
Ringo Starr – drums
George Martin – piano
Personnel per MacDonald

Cover versions

Charts

Notes

References

 
 
 
 
 
 
 
 
 

1960s ballads
1963 songs
The Beatles songs
Song recordings produced by George Martin
Songs written by Lennon–McCartney
Songs published by Northern Songs
Torch songs